Royal Air Force Little Snoring or more simply RAF Little Snoring is a former Royal Air Force station located north of the Norfolk village of Little Snoring.  The airfield remains open for general aviation use as Little Snoring Airfield.

History
Just a month after the station became operational, the stations status changed when No 3 Bomber Group gave the station full status.

After this the airfield was retained on a care and maintenance until an anti-aircraft co-operation unit on civilian contract operated from Little Snoring for several years during the 1950s.  Spitfires were the main type used, but were replaced by Vampires before the unit was disbanded in 1958.

Additional units
 No. 2 Civilian Anti-Aircraft Co-operation Unit
 No. 15 Heavy Glider Maintenance Section
 No. 274 Maintenance Unit RAF

Current use
The site is currently used as Little Snoring Airfield, operated by the McAully Flying Group, formerly the Fakenham Flying Group.  Airfield facilities include a private hangar and a clubhouse with pre-flight briefing facilities, kitchen and toilets. The eastern and southern parts of all three runways have been removed but the remainder are retained for flying.

The airfield is also used for aircraft manufacturing, The Light Aircraft Company has an aircraft maintenance facility which produces the Sherwood Ranger microlight.

The former mortuary is now a toilet and shower block at the villages' camp site. The site also features an air raid shelter and concrete pads for vehicles and temporary buildings.

References

Citations

Bibliography

 Collins, Dick and Jim Halladay. Despite the Elements: The History of Number 115 Squadron, 1917-1982. Brize Norton, UK: Nettlebed Press, 1983.
 Moyes, Philip J.R. Bomber Squadrons of the RAF and their Aircraft. London: Macdonald and Jane's (Publishers) Ltd., 2nd edition 1976. .

Royal Air Force stations in Norfolk
Royal Air Force stations of World War II in the United Kingdom
Airports in England